Keila KK is an Estonian basketball club based in Keila. The team plays its home games at Keila Health Center, which has capacity for 669 people. 

Since the 2022–23 season, the team plays in the Latvian-Estonian Basketball League after winning bronze in 1. Liiga championship.

References

Roster

Current roster

Depth chart

External links
Official website

Basketball teams in Estonia
Korvpalli Meistriliiga
Keila Parish